Åraksfjorden is a lake in the municipality of Bygland in Agder county, Norway.  The  lake is part of the Otra drainage basin.  The northern part of the lake is fed directly by the river Otra.  The southern part of the lake goes through a narrow channel which leads into the Byglandsfjorden.  The villages of Frøysnes and Skåmedal are located along the western side of the lake and on the eastern side are the villages of Sandnes and Åraksbø.  The Norwegian National Road 9 runs along the eastern side of the lake.

The central part of the lake is also called the Sandnesfjord and the southern part is also called the Blåfjord.

See also
List of lakes in Aust-Agder
List of lakes in Norway

References

Lakes of Agder
Setesdal
Bygland